Jesse Bradford (born May 28, 1979) is an American actor. He began his career as a child actor at the age of five and received two Young Artist Award for Best Leading Young Actor in a Feature Film nominations for his performances in King of the Hill in 1993 and Far From Home: The Adventures of Yellow Dog in 1995.

Early life 
Bradford was born Jesse Bradford Watrouse in Norwalk, Connecticut, the only child of actors Terry Porter and Curtis Watrouse, who appeared in commercials, soap operas, and industrial films. His mother also played his character's mother in Hackers (1995). Bradford's cousins are Jonathan Svec (a member of the bands Splender and Edison) and Sarah Messer, a writer and poet. He began acting at the age of eight months, appearing in a Q-Tip commercial. At his parents' encouragement, Bradford began modeling and auditioning for acting roles; his first film appearance was as Robert De Niro's son in Falling in Love (1984).

He graduated from Brien McMahon High School, where he was a self-described geology nerd. He was Homecoming King, captain of the tennis team, and was voted "best looking" and "favorite actor" by his high school class (although he was not in the drama club). He went on to attend Columbia University, from which he graduated in 2002 with a degree in film.

Career 
As a child actor, Bradford starred in the well-reviewed films Presumed Innocent (1990), King of the Hill (1993) and Far from Home: The Adventures of Yellow Dog (1995). Subsequently, he has had several notable roles in motion pictures, including Romeo + Juliet (1996) and Bring It On (2000), playing the romantic interest. In 2002, he appeared as the lead in two films — Clockstoppers and Swimfan. He also had a minor role as White House intern Ryan Pierce for nine episodes during the fifth season of The West Wing.

Bradford played the role of Rene Gagnon in the 2006 film Flags of Our Fathers, based on the book of the same name by James Bradley. The film is about the Battle of Iwo Jima and was directed by Academy Award-winning director Clint Eastwood. In 2009, Bradford was cast as one of the leads in I Hope They Serve Beer in Hell, based on Tucker Max's best-selling book.

Bradford was in the main cast of the short-lived NBC courtroom drama series Outlaw in 2010.

In 2016, he was in three episodes of Code Black.

Personal life
Bradford is married to Andrea Watrouse. In December 2020, Bradford announced on Instagram they were expecting a baby girl due 2021.

Filmography

Film

Television

References

External links 
 
 

1979 births
Actors from Norwalk, Connecticut
Male actors from Connecticut
American male child actors
American male film actors
American male television actors
Columbia University School of the Arts alumni
Nightclub owners
Living people
20th-century American male actors
21st-century American male actors